Ambarchik is a rural locality (a selo) and a port in Pokhodsky Rural Okrug of Nizhnekolymsky District of the Sakha Republic, Russia, located  from Chersky, the administrative center of the district and  from Pokhodsk. It is located on the shores of Ambarchik Bay, part of the East Siberian Sea in the Arctic Ocean. The Kolyma River empties into the bay. Its population as of the 2010 Census was 4, of whom 2 were male and 2 female, up from 0 recorded during the 2002 Census.

History
There had been a lighthouse marking Ambarchik Bay for several centuries and it is now an historic monument. However, there used to be a few barns and other buildings present in the middle of the eighteenth century when Dmitry Laptev stayed in the village when scouting the coastline from the mouth of the Lena River to Cape Bolshoy Baranov.

The importance of the settlement changed in the 1930s when it became a site of a Soviet forced labor camp. As part of Dalstroy the settlement acted as a transit camp for political and criminal exiles before they were moved to various camps along the Kolyma region. The remnants of this system can still be seen in the surrounds of the settlement where the ruins of warehouses, barracks, and cells are to be found along with hundreds of yards of barbed wire surrounding the area. The prisoners awaiting dispersal here built the current port infrastructure, starting in 1932.

As well as being a transit camp for the GULAG system, when construction began on the facilities for processing and transporting exiles, a polar research and meteorological station was also constructed in the village, beginning in 1935. The village would then play a supporting role in the Russian exploration of the Arctic.

Ambarchik came under fire during World War II when it was attacked by German forces as part of Operation Wunderland. The local population only just had time to arm themselves as German troops attempted to disembark from a submarine, the shallow waters surrounding the port preventing enemy vessels approaching too closely.

Formerly the main port on the East Siberian Sea, it was navigable only during August and September. As a result of the shallow waters mentioned above, the usefulness of the settlement as a port was limited and shipping was gradually transferred to Chersky in the lower reaches of the Kolyma to accommodate larger vessels. As a result of this economic transfer, the port and settlement has been all but abandoned.

Alleged 1933–34 incident
In an account by David Dallin and Boris Nicolaevsky in their 1947 book Forced Labor in Soviet Russia, it was suggested that in the winter of 1933–34 the SS Dzhurma, ferrying 12,000 prisoners to Ambarchik, got trapped in the Arctic ice and was unable to move on until the spring. The story alleged that all prisoners died from frost and starvation with later versions indicating that surviving crew members may have resorted to cannibalism to survive. The story was propagated and widely accepted. If true, this would have been among the worst ship disasters of all time.

In his book Stalin's Slave Ships, Bollinger examined the evidence and found that the Dzhurma did not enter service in the Dalstroi until 1935 and was not big enough to hold 12,000 prisoners. Bollinger estimated that the ship, if overcrowded, would be able to hold up to 6,500 prisoners. In addition, there are no accounts that this ship, which was not strengthened for Arctic travel, made the journey north through the Bering Strait to Ambarchik. Thus the alleged event has been proven not to be true. He suggested this could possibly be the case of a mistaken identity involving the cargo ship Khabarovsk that, if it had been carrying passengers had already had opportunity to deposit them at Ambarchik, and was trapped by ice when returning from Ambarchik in the 1933–34 winter.

References

Notes

Sources
Official website of the Sakha Republic. Registry of the Administrative-Territorial Divisions of the Sakha Republic. Nizhnekolymsky District.

Bibliography

External links
Potted history of the settlement

Rural localities in Nizhnekolymsky District
Populated places of Arctic Russia